Qareh Said (also Romanized as Qareh Saʿīd; also known as Qarah Seyyed and Qareh Seyyed) is a village in Ijrud-e Bala Rural District, in the Central District of Ijrud County, Zanjan Province, Iran. At the 2006 census, its population was 954, in 191 families.

References 

Populated places in Ijrud County